Emma Newman is a British science fiction and fantasy writer, podcaster and audiobook narrator. Her award nominations include the British Fantasy Award (categories: "best fantasy novel", "best newcomer") for Between Two Thorns in 2014 and the Arthur C. Clarke Award for After Atlas in 2017. Her Planetfall series was nominated for the 2020 Hugo Award for Best Series.

Career
Newman has published eleven novels and a collection of short fiction. Her hobbies include Live Action Role Playing and dressmaking. She lives in Somerset, England.

She is the co-creator, with her husband Peter Newman, of the Hugo Award winning podcast Tea and Jeopardy. The podcast has over 70 episodes and revolve around Emma hosting another creator for a nice cup of tea and cake, while her scheming butler Latimer (played by Peter Newman) attempts to send them to their deaths at the end of the episode.

Audiobooks narrated by Newman include some of her own work (Planetfall, From Dark Places, Between Two Thorns, Any Other Name, All Is Fair), as well as novels, novellas, and short stories by other authors, largely in the genres of science-fiction and fantasy.

Selected works

The Split Worlds – Urban fantasy
 Between Two Thorns (2013)  (nominated for the 2014 British Fantasy Society Award in two categories: "best fantasy novel" and "best newcomer")
 Any Other Name (2013) 
 All Is Fair (2013) 
 A Little Knowledge (2016) 
 All Good Things (2017)

Planetfall – Science fiction
 Planetfall (2015) 
 After Atlas (2016)  (nominated for the Clarke Award in 2017)
 Before Mars (2018) 
 Atlas Alone (2019)

Industrial Magic – Steampunk
 Brother's Ruin (2017) 
 Weaver's Lament (2017)

Short fiction
 From Dark Places (2011)

Further reading
Critical studies and reviews of Newman's work 
 Between Two Thorns

References

External links 

Emma Newman's personal website 
Tea and Jeopardy 

1976 births
Living people
British women writers
British fantasy writers
British science fiction writers
Women science fiction and fantasy writers
British women podcasters